La Simphonie du Marais is a French music ensemble established in 1987 by recorder player Hugo Reyne. Today, it is located in the Logis de la Chabotterie of Saint-Sulpice-le-Verdon in Vendée. It performs exclusively vocal and instrumental Baroque music (Rameau, Lully, Delalande…).

External links 
 La Simphonie du Marais célèbre son 30ème anniversaire cet automne on France Musique
 Biographie de la Simphonie du Marais on simphonie-du-marais.org
 La Simphonie du Marais on Ouest France
 Official website
 La Simphonie du Marais on Vendee.fr
 La Simphonie du Marais on Discogs
 La Simphonie du Marais - Delalande : Les Soupers du roi on YouTube

Baroque music groups